Magazines with the name Focus include:

 Focus (German Magazine), a German weekly news magazine
 Focus (Christian magazine), a Christian religion magazine published in the United States
 Focus (Italian magazine), an Italian popular scientific magazine
 Focus (Polish magazine), a Polish popular scientific monthly magazine
 Focus (Ukrainian magazine), a Ukrainian weekly news magazine in Russian language
 Focus (Photography magazine), the world’s premier journal for collectors of photography, bi-monthly
 BBC Focus, a science and technology magazine published by the BBC in the United Kingdom

See also
 Focus (disambiguation)
Fokus (magazine), a Swedish weekly news magazine